Verba volant, scripta manent is a Latin proverb. Literally translated, it means "spoken words fly away, written words remain".

This proverb originates from a speech of senator Caius Titus to the Roman Senate; the general meaning is that spoken words might easily be forgotten but written documents can always be relied on for conclusive proof. The legal meaning could be an extension of the usage of the old proverb. A related meaning is that if two people want to establish a formal agreement about something, it is better to put it in writing, rather than just having an oral agreement. It could also refer to the subsequent increase in recalling words that are written down than those that are merely spoken or thought about.

See also
 Common knowledge (logic)
 List of Latin phrases

References

Latin proverbs